Perhap is a village in Sahar block of Bhojpur district, Bihar, India. As of 2011, its population was 5,285, in 919 households. It is located in the central part of the block.

References 

Villages in Bhojpur district, India